Visa requirements for Somali citizens are administrative entry restrictions imposed on citizens of Somalia by the authorities of other states.

As of 2 July 2019, Somali citizens had visa-free or visa on arrival access to 30 countries and territories, ranking the Somali passport 105th in terms of travel freedom according to the Henley Passport Index.

Visa requirements map

Visa requirements

Dependent, Disputed, or Restricted territories
Unrecognized or partially recognized countries

Dependent and autonomous territories

Vaccination
Many African countries, including Angola, Benin, Burkina Faso, Cameroon, Central African Republic, Chad, Democratic Republic of the Congo, Republic of the Congo, Côte d'Ivoire, Equatorial Guinea, Gabon, Ghana, Guinea, Liberia, Mali, Mauritania, Niger, Rwanda, São Tomé and Príncipe, Senegal, Sierra Leone, Uganda, Zambia require all incoming passengers to have a current International Certificate of Vaccination. Some other countries require vaccination only if the passenger is coming from an infected area.

Passport validity

Many countries require passport validity of no less than 6 months and one or two blank pages.

See also 

 Visa policy of Somalia
 Somali passport
 List of nationalities forbidden at border

Notes

References

Somalia
Foreign relations of Somalia